"Wünderbar" is a song by Tenpole Tudor. Written by Edward Tudor-Pole and produced by Alan Winstanley, it was released by Stiff Records on 17 July 1981, and entered the UK Singles Chart on 1 August 1981, climbing to No. 16 and spending 8 weeks in the charts. It is a re-recorded version, somewhat faster than the version on the group's debut studio album Eddie, Old Bob, Dick and Gary.

Critical reception
In ironic review in August of 1981 David Hepworth of Smash Hits said that the band "had made a noise more normally associated with a coachload of Viking soccer hooligans" and summarised "these men should be locked up, failing that they should be stars."

Track listing
7" single
 "Wünderbar" - 2:52
 "Tenpole 45" - 4:12

Chart performance

References

1981 singles
Stiff Records singles
Tenpole Tudor songs
Songs written by Edward Tudor-Pole
1981 songs